The following Union Army units and commanders fought in the Battle of Peebles's Farm (Sept 30, 1864) during the Petersburg campaign of the American Civil War. The order of battle is compiled from the official tabulation of casualties and includes only units which sustained casualties. The Confederate Order of Battle is listed separately.

Abbreviations used

Military rank
 MG = Major General
 BG = Brigadier General
 Col = Colonel
 Ltc = Lieutenant Colonel
 Maj = Major
 Cpt = Captain
 Lt = Lieutenant

Other
 w = wounded
 mw = mortally wounded
 k = killed
 c = captured

Army of the Potomac

II Corps

V Corps

MG Gouverneur K. Warren

IX Corps

MG John G. Parke

Cavalry Corps

References

American Civil War orders of battle